Glycomyces xiaoerkulensis is a Gram-positive and aerobic bacterium from the genus of Glycomyces which has been isolated from silt from Xiaoerkule lake in China.

References 

Actinomycetia
Bacteria described in 2018